Miroslav Zálešák (born January 2, 1980) is a Slovak former professional ice hockey right winger who played in the National Hockey League for the San Jose Sharks. He is currently working as a European scout for the Colorado Avalanche.

Playing career
Zálešák was drafted 104th overall by the San Jose Sharks in the 1998 NHL Entry Draft. He has played 12 career NHL games, scoring 1 goal and 2 assists for 3 points. His only NHL goal was scored on March 11, 2003 against Brent Johnson and the visiting St. Louis Blues.

After the 2004–05 NHL lockout, Zálešák was not tendered a qualifying offer, as San Jose felt they had no room for him. Wanting to play in the NHL, Zálešák signed a contract with the Washington Capitals. However, Zálešák had a clause in his deal that stated if he ever was sent down to the AHL, he had the option of nullifying the contract. After being sent down, Zálešák exercised his option and returned to Slovakia to sign for his hometown team HK 36 Skalica before moving to HC Litvínov in the Czech Extraliga.  In 2005, Zálešák signed with Södertälje SK of the Swedish Elitserien and led the team in goals (16) and points (25). He returned to the Czech Republic with two seasons for HC Oceláři Třinec before returning to HK 36 Skalica.

International play
Zálešák played for Slovakia at the 2006 and 2010 World Championships.

Career statistics

Regular season and playoffs

International

References

External links

1980 births
Living people
Cleveland Barons (2001–2006) players
Colorado Avalanche scouts
Drummondville Voltigeurs players
Kentucky Thoroughblades players
HC Košice players
HC Litvínov players
HC Oceláři Třinec players
Sportspeople from Skalica
Piráti Chomutov players
ŠHK 37 Piešťany players
San Jose Sharks draft picks
San Jose Sharks players
HK 36 Skalica players
Slovak ice hockey right wingers
Södertälje SK players
Swindon Wildcats players
Yertis Pavlodar players
Expatriate ice hockey players in England
Expatriate ice hockey players in Kazakhstan
Slovak expatriate ice hockey players in the United States
Slovak expatriate ice hockey players in Canada
Slovak expatriate ice hockey players in Sweden
Slovak expatriate sportspeople in England
Slovak expatriate sportspeople in Kazakhstan
Slovak expatriate ice hockey players in the Czech Republic